Jairo Arias Serna (born 2 November 1938) was a Colombian footballer. He was a member of the Colombia national football team at the 1962 FIFA World Cup which was held in Chile.

References

1938 births
Living people
Colombian footballers
Colombia international footballers
1962 FIFA World Cup players
Atlético Nacional footballers
Independiente Santa Fe footballers
Once Caldas footballers
Unión Magdalena footballers
Categoría Primera A players
Association football forwards